Educational service district may refer to:

 Education service district (Oregon)
 Educational service district (Washington)